The Oration on the Dignity of Man (De hominis dignitate in Latin) is a public discourse composed in 1486 by Pico della Mirandola, an Italian scholar and philosopher of the Renaissance. It remained unpublished until 1496. The Pico Project–a collaboration between the University of Bologna and Brown University–and others have called it the "Manifesto of the Renaissance".

Pico, who belonged to the family that had long dwelt in the Castle of Mirandola, left his share of the ancestral principality to his two brothers to devote himself wholly to study. In his fourteenth year, 1477, he went to Bologna accompanied by his mother to study canon law and fit himself for the ecclesiastical career. Following his mother's death in 1478, Pico in 1479 requested from the Marquess of Mantua a free passage to Ferrara, where he would devote himself to the study of philosophy and theology. He spent the following seven years variously in Ferrara, Padua, Florence and Paris, studying Greek, Latin, Hebrew, Syriac, and Arabic at the chief universities of Italy and France.

Content

The potential of human achievement
Pico's Oration attempted to remap the human landscape to center all attention on human capacity and human perspective. Arriving in a place near Florence, he taught the amazing capacity of human achievement. "Pico himself had a massive intellect and studied everything there was to be studied in the university curriculum of the Renaissance; the Oration in part is meant to be a preface to a massive compendium of all the intellectual achievements of humanity, a compendium that never appeared because of Pico's early death."

Dignity of the liberal arts
Pico della Mirandola intended to speak in front of an invited audience of scholars and clerics of the dignity of the liberal arts and about the glory of angels. Of these angels he spoke of three divisions in particular: the Seraphim, Cherubim, and Thrones. These are the highest three choirs in the angel hierarchy, each one embodying a different virtue. The Seraphim represent charity, and in order to obtain the status of Seraphim, Mirandola declares that one must "burn with love for the Creator". The Cherubim represent intelligence. This status is obtained through contemplation and meditation. Finally, Thrones represent justice, and this is obtained by being just in ruling over "inferior things". Of these three, the Thrones is the lowest, Cherubim the middle, and Seraphim the highest. In this speech, Mirandola emphasizes the Cherubim and that by embodying the values of the Cherub, one can be equally prepared for "the fire of the Seraphim and the judgement of the Thrones". This deviation into the hierarchy of angels makes sense when Pico della Mirandola makes his point that a philosopher "is a creature of Heaven and not of earth" because they are capable of obtaining any one of the statuses.

Importance of human quest for knowledge
In the Oration, Pico justified the importance of the human quest for knowledge within a Neoplatonic framework. He writes that after God had created all creatures, He conceived of the desire for another sentient being who would appreciate all His works, but there was no longer any room in the chain of being; all the possible slots from angels to worms had been filled. So, God created man such that he had no specific slot in the chain. Instead, men were capable of learning from and imitating any existing creature. When man philosophizes, he ascends the chain of being towards the angels, and communion with God. When he fails to exercise his intellect, he vegetates. Pico did not fail to notice that this system made philosophers like himself among the most dignified human creatures.

The idea that men could ascend the chain of being through the exercise of their intellectual capacities was a profound endorsement of the dignity of human existence in this earthly life. The root of this dignity lay in his assertion that only human beings could change themselves through their own free will, whereas all other changes in nature were the result of some outside force acting on whatever it is that undergoes change. He observed from history that philosophies and institutions were always in change, making man's capacity for self-transformation the only constant. Coupled with his belief that all of creation constitutes a symbolic reflection of the divinity of God, Pico's philosophies had a profound influence on the arts, helping to elevate writers and painters from their medieval role as mere artisans to the Renaissance ideal of the artist as genius.

Introduction to Pico's 900 theses
The Oration also served as an introduction to Pico's 900 theses, which he believed to provide a complete and sufficient basis for the discovery of all knowledge, and hence a model for mankind's ascent of the chain of being. The 900 Theses are a good example of humanist syncretism, because Pico combined Platonism, Neoplatonism, Aristotelianism, Hermeticism and Kabbalah. They also included 72 theses describing what Pico believed to be a complete system of physics. Pico also argued in this oration that his youth should not discredit any of the content of his 900 theses (he was in his twenties).

Pico had "cosmic ambitions": in his letters and early texts, he hinted that debate of the 900 theses (the first printed book ever universally banned by the Church) might trigger Christ's Second Coming and the end of the world. Innocent VIII condemned the theses in general but declared the author to be free from censure. This was written on August 5, 1487 but it was not issued until the following December. In a letter to Lorenzo dated August 27, 1489, Pico affirms among other things some of his thesis refer purely to profane matters and were never intended for general reading, but for private debate among the learned.

Mystical vocation of humanity
In the Oration he argues, in the words of Pier Cesare Bori, that "human vocation is a mystical vocation that has to be realized following a three stage way, which comprehends necessarily moral transformation, intellectual research and final perfection in the identity with the absolute reality. This paradigm is universal, because it can be retraced in every tradition."

Pico defends philosophy
Here Pico explains why he chose to become a philosopher. A paraphrase of paragraph 24:

These are the reasons why I decided to study philosophy. And I'm not going to explain them to anyone except those who condemn philosophy. Philosophy is not something to be used scornfully or as insult, but for honor and glory. People are beginning to think wrongly in that philosophy should only be studied by very few, if any at all, as if it is something of little worth. We have reduced philosophy to only being useful when being used for profit. I say these things with regret and indignation for the philosophers who say it should not be pursued because it has no value, thus disqualifying themselves as philosophers. Since they are in it for their own personal gain, they miss the truth for its own sake. I'm going to say, not to brag, but I've never philosophized except for the sake of philosophy, and have never desired it for my own cultivation. I have been able to lose myself in philosophy and not be influenced by others who try to pull me away from it. Philosophy has taught me to rely on my own convictions rather than on the judgments of others and to concern myself less with whether I am well thought of than whether what I do or say is evil.

Delivery

Pico was prevented from holding his Oration. It was penned as the opening speech for a public disputation of his 900 theses, planned for early 1487, but Pope Innocent VIII suspended the event and instead set up a commission to examine the theses for heresy. A presentation of the full text in English in front of a live audience read by Sebastian Michael took place at TU Wien (University of Technology Vienna) as part of the opening event of the first Sophistication Conference organised by the Department for Architecture Theory and Philosophy of Technics on 7 December 2017.

References

External links
 Original in Latin
English translated (Archive)

1486 books
1496 books
Human rights instruments
Renaissance humanism
Social philosophy literature
Medieval philosophical literature
Cherubim